Giuseppe Battista (11 February 1610 – 6 March 1675) was a prolific Italian marinist poet.

Biography 
Giuseppe Battista was born in Grottaglie, between Brindisi and Taranto. When very young he lost his parents; but he was able to study both at his native place and later with the Jesuits in Naples. Here he came to the notice of Giovanni Battista Manso, who apparently took him to live at his own house. He became a member of the Oziosi; and was Manso's literary executor. After the death of Manso (1645) Battista spent some time with the Prince of Avellino, and then withdrew to his native village, where he lived a simple literary life. Though greatly troubled by physical ailments, he made frequent journeys in southern Italy. He died at Naples, March 6, 1675.

Critical assessment 

Battista's poems were once admired; they fitted the taste of their day. Girolamo Tiraboschi finds Battista 'a bad poet, who united in himself all the faults of his age,' but admits that his treatise on Poetry (1676) was influential. According to Benedetto Croce Battista was, together with Giuseppe Artale, the founder of a school of poetry aiming at going further the baroque in its quest for novelty. 'Giuseppe Battista was the leader, Giuseppe Artale the second in command of that sort of "baroque of the baroque" which flourished in the second half of the seventeenth century.'

Battista appears to have been on friendly terms with Pietro Alois, Lorenzo Crasso, Pietro Michiele, and Giovanni Francesco Loredano.

Works

Notes

Bibliography 

 
 
 Snyder, Jon R. "Truth and Wonder in Naples circa 1640." In Culture and Authority in the Baroque, ed. Massimo Ciavolella and Patrick Coleman, 85–105. Toronto, 2005.

Italian poets
Italian male poets
1610 births
1675 deaths
17th-century Neapolitan people
baroque writers
Marinism